Kannadi Pookal ( Glass Flowers) is a 2005 Indian Tamil-language film released on 28 January 2005. It was directed by K. Shahjahan, who previously directed Punnagai Desam. The film was a remake of Malayalam film Ente Veedu Appuvinteyum, which in turn was inspired by a real-life incident in Kerala. The film received positive reviews from critics.

Plot
Meera marries her neighbor Sakthivel, after Sakthi's wife dies giving birth to Vasudevan. Meera decides not to have children and raises vasu as her own son, and the trio leads a very happy life. But, Meera's widowed father Big bird is unhappy as his lineage will die out and his wealth will get depleted, with Meera caring for someone else's child. When vasu reaches the age of 9, Meera accidentally becomes pregnant. This changes the focus of the entire family to the unborn child, deeply hurting vasu. He is often belittled for his attention-seeking actions, and ignored more when the baby boy is born. Within weeks, Vasu is pushed to the limits, and he kills the baby using bug spray. Due to a complaint filed by Sakthi, Vasu is arrested and put in a government-run juvenile prison. His family is devastated, but they forgive him wholeheartedly.

Slowly, Vasu regrets his actions, spirals into depression and his health worsens. The family doctor advises Sakthi that the only way to save Vasu from depression is for them to have another baby, and make Vasu raise that baby. That way, he will get over the guilt of his mistake. The couple agrees. Slowly, he begins to get along well with other children and wants to move back to his family. Eventually, Meera is pregnant, but the doctor tells Sakthi not tell Vasu until his release day. On the day he's released, Vasu meets his former schoolmates at an interschool event and realizes that society will always see him as a murderer. Vasu refuses to return home after the competition. But the family manages to console him, and Vasu returns home to his waiting family. He sees his baby brother in the crib, is overjoyed and picks him up. Everything ends well with the family altogether.

Cast
 Parthiban as Sakthivel. 
 Kaveri as Meera. 
 Master Ashwin as Vasudevan
 Rajkapoor as Policeman. 
M. N. Nambiar as Court Judge. 
 Fathima Babu as Meera's Mother. 
 Pyramid Natrajan as Meera's Father
 Sarath Babu as child psychiatrist
 Ponnambalam as jail warden
Anandaraj as Sakthivel's Friend
Nizhalgal Ravi as Vasudevan's Lawyer
Thalaivasal Vijay as Opposite Lawyer of Vasudevan
Mayilsamy as Jail Child Caretaker
Paravai Muniyamma as Dancer and Singer in Dey Vasu Song.

Soundtrack

The Music was composed by S.A. Rajkumar and Released on Anak Audio.

References

External links

2004 films
2000s Tamil-language films
Tamil remakes of Malayalam films